The 1889 Indiana Hoosiers football team was an American football team that represented Indiana University Bloomington during the 1889 college football season. In Indiana's third season of intercollegiate football, Evans Woollen, a 24-year-old Yale University graduate, served as the school's football coach. Indiana played only two games, a 6–6 tie with DePauw University and a 40–2 loss to Wabash College.

Schedule

References

Indiana
Indiana Hoosiers football seasons
College football winless seasons
Indiana Hoosiers football